"Would I Lie to You?" is a song written and performed by the British pop duo Eurythmics. Released on 9 April 1985 as the lead single from the band's fourth studio album, Be Yourself Tonight (1985), the song was the first by the duo to feature their change in musical direction from a predominantly synthpop style to rock and rhythm and blues. The song, and its accompanying album, featured a full backing band and relied less on electronic programming.

Lyrically, the song features Lennox confronting a cheating lover as she leaves him for good. This was conveyed in the music video for the single, in which actor Steven Bauer played the part of the boyfriend. The video was directed by Mary Lambert and was shown heavily on MTV. The front and back cover photos, and the inner cover art of the Be Yourself Tonight album are screenshots from the music video.

Cash Box said that "hard rocking early Kinks guitar and a pounding Motown drum beat forms the background for Annie Lennox’s R&B lead vocal."

"Would I Lie to You?" is one of Eurythmics' most recognised tunes and continued the band's run of hit singles. In the UK, the song peaked at number 17, while it went to number five on the U.S. Billboard Hot 100, becoming their third and last Top 10 hit in the U.S. Furthermore, it is the duo's biggest hit in Australia, where it topped the Kent Music Report for two weeks. In 1985 Kids Incorporated covered "Would I Lie to You" in the Season 2 episode "The Boy From Togo". They covered the song again in 1987 in the Season 4 episode "The Boy Who Cried Gorilla".

Composition

Stewart set out to make a song with a "killer R&B riff". He worked it out one morning while having breakfast with his acoustic guitar on his knee. At first, Annie Lennox was hesitant, as it didn't fit their sound.

Stewart said, "When we started putting it down the song had a lot of energy and inspired Annie to come up with the great lyric, 'Would I Lie To You" and a melody with very odd answering harmonies, 'Now, would I say something that wasn't true.' These harmonies are very unusual and Annie is a genius at working them out very quickly in her head. The song started to be a fusion between Stax type R&B and Eurythmics."

Track listings
7-inch
A. "Would I Lie To You?" (7-inch version) – 4:09
B. "Here Comes That Sinking Feeling" (LP version)* – 5:40

12-inch
A1. "Would I Lie To You?" (E.T. mix) – 4:59
B1. "Would I Lie To You?" (extended version) – 4:52
B2. "Here Comes That Sinking Feeling" (LP version)* – 5:40
* This version, although labelled as "LP version", is an alternate mix of the song released on the album Be Yourself Tonight

Personnel
 Annie Lennox – vocals
 David A. Stewart – guitars, sequencers
 Olle Romo – drums
 Nathan East – bass guitar
 Benmont Tench – organ
 Dave Plews – trumpet
 Martin Dobson – saxophones

Charts

Weekly charts

Year-end charts

References

 

1985 songs
1985 singles
Eurythmics songs
Music videos directed by Mary Lambert
Number-one singles in Australia
RCA Records singles
Songs written by David A. Stewart
Songs written by Annie Lennox
Song recordings produced by Dave Stewart (musician and producer)